Megachile stilbonotaspis is a species of bee in the family Megachilidae. It was described by Moure in 1945.

References

Stilbonotaspis
Insects described in 1945